The Stade Jean-Bouin is a multi-purpose stadium in the 16th arrondissement of Paris, France. The 19,904 capacity facility is located across the street from the much larger Parc des Princes, and is used mostly for rugby union and association football matches. It is the home stadium of Stade Français and FC Versailles.

History 
The stadium was opened in 1925, and is named after the athlete Jean Bouin, the 5000 metre silver medalist from 1912 Olympics. It was the venue for the France Sevens leg of the World Rugby Sevens Series in 2005, 2006, and 2017–20. Before its temporary closure for an expansion project that began in summer 2010, it seated 12,000 people, The stadium reopened in 2013 with seating for 20,000 spectators. To accommodate the expansion, Stade Français moved its primary home ground to Stade Sébastien Charléty, also in Paris, for 2010–11. Stade Jean-Bouin  hosted the semi-finals, third-place match, and final of the 2014 Women's Rugby World Cup. Since 2018, the Paris Saint-Germain Féminines football team also plays its home matches at Stade Jean-Bouin. Stade Jean-Bouin  hosted the opening ceremony of the 2018 Gay Games written and directed by Rodolph Nasillski.

In March 2023, the American Football team Paris Musketeers announced that they would host their home games for the 2023 European League of Football season at Stade Jean-Bouin.

References

External links 

 Stade Jean Bouin at the Paris Convention and Visitors Bureau
 Stadium Jean Bouin at Paris Saint-Germain
 L'association Pour la rénovation du stade Jean Bouin

1925 establishments in France
Stade Jean-Bouin
Football venues in France
Multi-purpose stadiums in France
Paris Saint-Germain Féminine
Red Star F.C.
Rugby union stadiums in France
Sports venues completed in 1925
Sports venues in Paris
Stade Français
Stade Jean-Bouin
European League of Football venues